Janice Grube is an American singer-songwriter based in Portland, Oregon. She was the voice and main songwriter for the Los Angeles band, Watsonville Patio.

After a few years removed from the music industry, Grube started WK Radio, Wieden+Kennedy's in house internet radio station. After a brief hiatus in summer 2009, WK Radio returns in September as WKE (WKEntertainment), W+K's new content driven entertainment channel. Filmmaker Aaron Rose was also hired to help create WKE alongside Grube and Bill Davenport.

Grube currently serves as WKE's content director and executive producer of several television projects, including 12, Don't Move Here, and Califunya.

References

External links
 The Lantern: Watsonville Patio to open doors in Columbus with garage-rock style
 Musical Discoveries Review Digest, Volume 1, Issue 1

1971 births
American women singer-songwriters
American women rock singers
American rock songwriters
Living people
Musicians from Portland, Oregon
Wieden+Kennedy people
Singer-songwriters from Oregon
21st-century American women singers
21st-century American singers

ms:Alanis Morrissette
nl:Alanis Morissette